Johan Andersson i Raklösen  (29 June 1866 – 19 January 1924) was a Swedish politician. He was a member of the Centre Party.

Centre Party (Sweden) politicians
1866 births
1924 deaths